is a passenger railway station located in the city of Nagahama, Shiga, Japan, operated by the West Japan Railway Company (JR West).

Lines

Station layout
The station consists of two opposed side platforms connected by a footbridge. The station is staffed.

Platform

History
Torahime station opened on 1 June 1902 on the Japanese Government Railway (JGR) Hokuriku Main Line.  The station came under the aegis of the West Japan Railway Company (JR West) on April 1, 1987 due to the privatization of Japan National Railway. 

Station numbering was introduced in March 2018 with Torahime being assigned station number JR-A08.

Passenger statistics
In fiscal 2019, the station was used by an average of 709 passengers daily (boarding passengers only).

Surrounding area
former Torahime Town Office
Nagahamashi City Torahime Library
Nagahama City Torahime Cultural Hall (Suisenkan)
Shiga Prefectural Torahime High School

See also
List of railway stations in Japan

References

External links

0541404 JR West official home page

Railway stations in Shiga Prefecture
Railway stations in Japan opened in 1902
Hokuriku Main Line
Nagahama, Shiga